Just Say Ozzy is a live EP by Ozzy Osbourne. It was released on March 17, 1990 and was remastered on August 22, 1995.

Overview
The sleeve states that Just Say Ozzy was recorded at London's Brixton Academy in November 1989. However, no known dates correspond (the tour ended in August 1989 in Moscow), and the music appears to have been re-recorded and mixed at Electric Lady Studios in New York with engineer Adam Yellin with the audience noise and some tracks kept from the original live recording.

Just Say Ozzy was remastered in 1995 along with the rest of the singer's catalog. However, the EP —along with Speak Of The Devil, The Ultimate Sin and Live & Loud —has since been deleted from Ozzy's catalog and was not remastered and reissued with the rest of Ozzy's catalog in 2002. This is mainly due to a continuing legal struggle with bassist/songwriter Phil Soussan over the song "Shot in the Dark".

Just Say Ozzy peaked at number 58 on the Billboard 200 and was certified Gold on July 21, 1993.

The tracks "Sweet Leaf" and "War Pigs" were composed and originally recorded by Black Sabbath, the group Osbourne fronted in the 1970s.

Track listing

Personnel
Ozzy Osbourne - vocals
Zakk Wylde - guitar
Geezer Butler - bass
Randy Castillo - drums
John Sinclair- keyboards

Production
Andy Johns - producer, engineer, mixing
Adam Yellin - recording engineer, mixing
Sally Browder - assistant engineer
Vlado Meller - mastering
Brian Lee and Bob Ludwig - 1995 remastering

Charts

Certifications

References 

1990 EPs
Ozzy Osbourne live albums
Albums produced by Andy Johns
Epic Records live albums
Albums recorded at the Brixton Academy